Edward Patrick O'Brien (July 14, 1917 – March 29, 1983) was an American film and television actor.

O'Brien was born in Fargo, North Dakota. He worked as a radio announcer in North Dakota before moving to Hollywood in the 1930s. He began appearing in films, and also worked as a manager at the Carthay Circle Theatre. During World War II he gave up acting to work as a stevedore in the San Francisco docks. 

In 1953 O'Brien appeared in the television series This Is the Life, later making three appearances in Harbor Command.

O'Brien appeared in films such as High Velocity, Rough Night in Jericho, The Honkers, Chamber of Horrors, Looking for Mr. Goodbar, No Deposit, No Return, The Pack, The Thief Who Came to Dinner, The Andromeda Strain, and Pieces of Dreams. On television, O'Brien had recurring roles in The Smith Family and the action and crime drama television series S.W.A.T. He also guest-starred in television programs including Gunsmoke, Bonanza, Barnaby Jones, Trapper John, M.D., 12 O'Clock High, Cannon, The Streets of San Francisco, My Three Sons, The Rockford Files, Quincy, M.E., Rawhide, The Wild Wild West, The Fugitive, The Big Valley and General Hospital.

O'Brien died in March 1983 of cancer at his home in Los Angeles, California, at the age of 65.

Filmography

References

External links 

Rotten Tomatoes profile

1917 births
1983 deaths
People from Fargo, North Dakota
Male actors from North Dakota
American male film actors
American male television actors
20th-century American male actors
American radio personalities